Kirik may refer to:

 3588 Kirik, a main-belt asteroid named after Kirik the Novgorodian
 Kırık, Kastamonu, a village in Turkey
 Kırık Hayatlar, a Turkish drama film
 Kırık Kalpler Durağında, a studio album by Candan Erçetin
 Kirik Party, a 2016 Indian Kannada film
 Kırık Plak (The Broken Disk), a 1959 Turkish romantic drama
 Kirik the Novgorodian (1110 – ca. 1156/1158), a Russian monk and chronicler
 Kırık, Yığılca
 Kırık, Horasan
 Kırık, İspir